Omiodes telegrapha, the telegraphic hedyleptan moth, is a species of moth in the family Crambidae. It is endemic to the island of Hawaii.

The larvae probably feed on grasses.

References

Sources

Moths described in 1899
Endemic moths of Hawaii
telegrapha
Taxonomy articles created by Polbot
Taxa named by Edward Meyrick